Francisco Menéndez (before 1709 – after 1763) was a notable free Black militiaman who served the Spanish Empire in Florida during the 18th-century. He was leader of Fort Mose, the first free Black settlement in North America.

Born in The Gambia in West Africa, Menéndez was captured and sold into slavery, being purchased by European slave traders and shipped across the Atlantic to Carolina. He escaped into the Spanish colony of Florida soon after, taking advantage of Spanish legislation promising freedom to all fugitive slaves from the Southern colonies. Menéndez converted to Catholicism and enlisted in the colonial militia, settling down in a settlement created for free people of color by the Spanish authorities. Participating in numerous conflicts on the side of the Spanish Crown, Menéndez was recognized by the Spanish Crown for his loyalty and courage through the numerous conflicts he participated in. Francisco was also recognized as the founder of San Agustín de la Nueva Florida, a village in Cuba.

Fort Mose has since been designated as a National Historic Landmark, as it was the first legal free Black community in what is now the United States.

African birth
Menéndez was born along the Gambia River in Africa; he was of Mandinga descent. According to a modern scholar,he was from the Mali empire—as many Mandinga were—and literate in Arabic. He was captured and sold by slave traders, and probably was shipped to Carolina sometime between 1709 and 1711, during a period of significantly increased importation of African slaves.

In Florida
Like many other enslaved Blacks, Menéndez escaped his bondage and sought refuge in Spanish Florida. He was the epitome of what historian Ira Berlin called the Atlantic creoles: people shipped from the slave ports in Africa who acquired "linguistic dexterity, cultural plasticity, and social agility". Starting in 1680s, Spain allowed people that had fled from slavery in English colonies to remain in Florida. While they were required to be baptized Catholics and to work for the colony, they were paid for their labor. In 1693, Spanish King Carlos II made the policy official. In 1733, Philip V amended the policy to place newly-arrived fugitive slaves in indentured servitude for four years. They were expected to learn the Catholic faith and accept baptism. They were required as well to be ready to protect the territory as part of the militia for four years.

In Florida he aided in the defense of St. Augustine in 1727, earning his freedom and establishing his reputation for leadership. He was recognized as a subject of the King of Spain and baptized in the Catholic Church as Francisco Menéndez. Despite his conversion and military service, Menéndez and many of his fellow militia were still slaves.Contradicts previous ¶. When Manuel de Montiano became governor in 1737, Menéndez petitioned for his freedom. On March 15, 1738, he was granted unconditional freedom. Years later, he was appointed head of the colonial militia based at Fort Mose, built in 1738, and the overall leader of its resident community. From this base, Menéndez led several raids against Carolinian plantations, and inspired further unrest amongst the enslaved population in the colony.

In 1740, a British expeditionary force invaded Florida and captured Fort Mose during the War of Jenkins' Ear. Days later Spanish and Fort Mose militiamen counter-attacked and defeated the British, forcing them to retreat from the region. Fort Mose was destroyed during the battle, but was rebuilt after the conclusion of the war.

Menéndez proceeded to enlist on a Spanish privateer to attack enemy merchant shipping. In 1741, Menéndez was captured by the privateer Revenge, whose captain proceeded to sell Menéndez into slavery in the Bahamas. Whether he escaped or was ransomed by the Spanish is not known, but by 1759 he was once more back in Florida as the leader of the free Black community at Fort Mose.

Evacuation to Cuba
He continued to live at Fort Mose until Spanish Florida was ceded to the British in 1763, following their defeat of France in the Seven Years' War. In the Treaty of Paris, the British exchanged territory with Spain, taking over Florida in exchange for the return of Havana and Manila. Together with most of the Spanish colonists from St. Augustine and the Fort Mose community, Menéndez was evacuated by the Spanish crown to Cuba. There he established a similar community called San Agustín de la Nueva Florida (St. Augustine of the New Florida).

Legacy and honors

The site of Fort Mose, where Menéndez led the militia, is now designated by the United States as a National Historic Landmark. The original site was rediscovered in an archeological dig in the 1990s, and has been protected as Fort Mose Historic State Park, owned and run by the Florida Park Service. It is widely known as the first legally-sanctioned free community of freedmen and a destination for African-American refugees from slavery. It served as a precursor to the Underground Railroad that developed during the Antebellum years. Francisco Menéndez's life story frequently features in reenactments at Fort Mose.

Children's book
The story of Fort Mose and Francisco Menéndez is told in a juvenile book published in 2010.

See also
 Fort Mose
 Real cédula of 1693
 Siege of Fort Mose
 Slavery in the colonial United States
 Spanish Florida

References

Sources

Berlin, Ira. Many Thousands Gone: The First Two Centuries of Slavery in North America. Cambridge, Massachusetts: The Belknap Press of Harvard University Press, 1998. p. 74-75.

Landers, Jane, Black Society in Spanish Florida.  Urbana:  University of Illinois Press, 1999.

Further reading
 

Spanish soldiers
Pre-statehood history of Florida
18th-century Spanish military personnel
People of Spanish Florida
American rebel slaves
18th-century American slaves
Spanish people of Gambian descent
Fugitive American slaves
Year of birth uncertain
Year of death missing
History of slavery in Florida
American slaves literate in Arabic